Kampung Pelawan (Chinese:巴拉湾) or Kampong Pahlawan is a village in Perak, Malaysia. The villagers are of Chinese heritage. They mainly speak the Ho Poh dialect. Farming, including working on plantations and operating farm equipment, is the main occupation.

History 
During World War II, Japan invaded the country, creating chaos. The  (English: "Red Door"), a resistance force, was formed to fight the Japanese army. Members undertook secret training. More members joined and eventually forced the Japanese army to retreat. In 1945, after the Japanese army surrendered, many villages were formed throughout Malaysia. The Hong Men were seen as heroes, and the name 'Pelawan' (from the Malay  meaning "hero") was given to the village in their honour.

References 

 

Villages in Perak